William Leroy Broun (October 1, 1827 – January 24, 1902) was the President of the Agricultural and Mechanical College of Alabama, then known as the Alabama Polytechnic Institute, now known as Auburn University, from 1882 to 1902, with a one-year hiatus in 1883.

Biography
William Leroy Broun was born in Middleburg, Virginia on October 1, 1827. He graduated from the University of Virginia in 1850. During the American Civil War, he headed the Confederate Arsenal at Richmond, Virginia.

He taught at the College of Mississippi in 1852,  the University of Georgia in 1854 and again in 1866. He was a school principal of Bloomfield academy, Virginia, in 1856. From 1872 to 1875, he taught at UGA again, and became President of the Georgia Agricultural and Mechanical College, a branch of the University. From 1875 to 1882, he was a Professor of mathematics at Vanderbilt University in Nashville, Tennessee. He also taught mathematics at the University of Texas in 1884.

From 1882 to 1902, he served as the President of the Agricultural and Mechanical College of Alabama, then known as the Alabama Polytechnic Institute, now known as Auburn University, with a one-year hiatus in 1883.

Bibliography
Notes On Artillery: From Robins, Hutton, Chesney, Mordecai, Dahlgreen, Jacob, Greener, Gibbon, And Benton (1862)

References

1827 births
1902 deaths
People from Middleburg, Virginia
People of Virginia in the American Civil War
University of Virginia alumni
University of Georgia faculty
Vanderbilt University faculty
University of Texas faculty
Presidents of Auburn University
19th-century American businesspeople